The following image is a family tree of every prince, king, queen, monarch, confederation president and emperor of Germany, from Charlemagne in 800 over Louis the German in 843 through to Wilhelm II in 1918. It shows how almost every single ruler of Germany was related to every other by marriages, and hence they can all be put into a single tree.

For ease of understanding the royal house names and dates have been put in at the appropriate places. The dynasties covered are the Carolingians, Conradines, Ottonians, Salians, Supplinburger, Hohenstaufen, Welf, Habsburg, Nassau, Luxemburg, Wittelsbach, Lorraine, Habsburg-Lorraine, Bonaparte and Hohenzollern.

Only undisputed kings are included here; this excludes rulers whose claims were disputed such as the co-rulers Richard, 1st Earl of Cornwall and Alfonso X of Castile.

'King of Germany' does not necessarily mean that the king was referred to as such. Until 911 the kings were known as 'Kings of East Francia'. After that the title fluctuated between 'King of Germany' and 'King of the Germans'. From Henry IV on, the kings were "King of the Romans", a reference to the claim on Rome, although this was not often ruled by them.

Family tree

See also
Family tree of French monarchs

Family tree
German monarch